John McKay Williams (October 27, 1945  – July 8, 2012) was a National Football League offensive lineman from 1968 through 1979. During that span he appeared in three Super Bowls: Super Bowl III and Super Bowl V for the Baltimore Colts; and Super Bowl XIV for the Los Angeles Rams. He played college football at the University of Minnesota where he was a First-team All-Big Ten tackle in 1967 and led the Gophers to the Big Ten title.  Williams died on July 8, 2012, in Minneapolis, Minnesota, at the age of 66, while out for a walk.  He had recently been the recipient of a kidney transplant.

References

1945 births
2012 deaths
Players of American football from Jackson, Mississippi
American football offensive tackles
American football offensive guards
Minnesota Golden Gophers football players
Baltimore Colts players
Los Angeles Rams players